John Lowder was an architect and surveyor working in Bath, Somerset, England. He was the Bath City Surveyor for a short time.

In Bath, he designed the Commissioners' church of Holy Trinity, James Street, (1819–1822) in the classical style but it was constructed in a Gothic style. Declared redundant after being severely damaged by bombing in 1942, the structure was demolished in 1957 and its congregation moved to a neighbouring church, which has subsequently been renamed Holy Trinity, Queens Square.

List of works
Rectory, now Bishopstone House, Bishopstone near Salisbury, 1812–1819
The National School, Bath, 1816–1818 (demolished in the late 1960s)
Holy Trinity, James Street, 1819–1822 (demolished in the late 1950s)

Footnotes

19th-century English architects
Architects from Bath, Somerset
Year of birth missing
Year of death missing